The Langdon Filling Station is a historic automotive service station at 311 Park Avenue in Hot Springs, Arkansas.  It is a single-story masonry building, constructed out of concrete blocks and finished with brick veneer, and houses three service bays and a small office and storage area.  The building has a steeply-pitched roof with rectangular vents in the English (Tudor) Revival style.  Built about 1938, it was used as a service station into the 1990s.

The building was listed on the National Register of Historic Places in 2004.

See also
National Register of Historic Places listings in Garland County, Arkansas

References

Gas stations on the National Register of Historic Places in Arkansas
Tudor Revival architecture in the United States
Buildings and structures completed in 1938
Buildings and structures in Hot Springs, Arkansas
National Register of Historic Places in Hot Springs, Arkansas